Veins is the seventh studio album by American rapper Homeboy Sandman. It was released by Stones Throw Records on March 31, 2017. Homeboy Sandman described the inspiration for the album as simply "a burning desire to just fuckin rhyme."

Critical reception

Robert Christgau wrote that if Sandman's "flow and beats were a smidge more iconic, he'd epitomize the kind of major minor artistry Le Tigre--hell, Spoon or somebody--parlayed into legend." In a review for HipHopDX, Kyle Eustice wrote: "In this often vapid world of meaningless lyrics, having to actually dissect what an MC is saying is... like a breath of fresh air." Veins was selected as one of the best hip hop albums of 2017 by Bandcamp Daily author Phillip Mlynar.

Track listing

References

External links
 
 Robert Christgau on Homeboy Sandman's Constant, Anti-Boredom Reincarnations

2017 albums
Homeboy Sandman albums
Stones Throw Records albums
Albums produced by 88-Keys